The 2023 Samara Oblast gubernatorial election will take place on 10 September 2023, on common election day. Incumbent Governor Dmitry Azarov is eligible to run for a second term in office.

Background
Federation Council member Dmitry Azarov, a former Mayor of Samara, was appointed acting Governor of Samara Oblast in September 2017, replacing controversial 5-year Governor Nikolay Merkushkin, who resigned at his own request. Azarov overwhelmingly won the 2018 gubernatorial election in his own right with 72.63% of the vote over a field of 5 opponents.

Candidates
In Samara Oblast candidates for Governor can be nominated only by registered political parties, self-nomination is not possible. However, candidates are not obliged to be members of the nominating party. Candidate for Governor of Samara Oblast should be a Russian citizen and at least 30 years old. Candidates for Governor should not have a foreign citizenship or residence permit. Each candidate in order to be registered is required to collect at least 5% of signatures of members and heads of municipalities. Also gubernatorial candidates present 3 candidacies to the Federation Council and election winner later appoints one of the presented candidates.

Potential
 Mikhail Abdalkin (CPRF), Member of Samara Regional Duma (2021–present)
 Dmitry Azarov (United Russia), incumbent Governor of Samara Oblast (2017–present)
 Gennady Govorkov (CPRF), Member of Samara Regional Duma (2016–present)
 Vladimir Koshelev (LDPR), Member of State Duma (2021–present)
 Aleksey Leskin (CPRF), Deputy Chairman of the Samara Regional Duma (2016–present), Member of Samara Regional Duma (2007–present), 2018 gubernatorial candidate
 Andrey Lugovoy (LDPR), Member of State Duma (2007–present)
 Mikhail Matveyev (CPRF), Member of State Duma (2021–present), 2014 gubernatorial candidate
 Aleksandr Mileyev (United Russia), Deputy Chairman of the Samara Regional Duma (2021–present), Member of Samara Regional Duma (2011–present)
 Aleksey Mitrofanov (SR–ZP), Member of Samarsky City District Council of Deputies (2020–present)
 Aleksandr Stepanov (LDPR), Member of Samara Regional Duma (2016–present), 2018 gubernatorial candidate

Declined
 Alexander Khinshtein (United Russia), Member of State Duma (2003–2016, 2018–present), Chairman of the Duma Committee on Informational Policy, Technologies and Communications (2020–present)

See also
2023 Russian regional elections

References

Samara Oblast
Samara Oblast
Politics of Samara Oblast
September 2023 events in Russia
Future elections in Russia